Mark Stimson (born 7 May 1972 in Temora, New South Wales, Australia) is an Australian former professional rugby league footballer who played for the Balmain Tigers and Wests Tigers in the 1990s and 2000s.Stimson played in the Turvey Park Lions premiership team in 1993.

Playing career
A Temora Dragons junior, Stimson made his debut for the Sydney Tigers in 1996. He went on to play in 77 games for the club over the next four seasons.  Stimson played in Balmain's final game as a stand-alone entity which was against the Canberra Raiders at Bruce Stadium in Round 26 1999.  Balmain lost the match 42-14.  

At the end of 1999, Balmain merged with Western Suburbs to form the Wests Tigers and Stimson was part of the inaugural side for the new franchise.  Stimson played in the club's inaugural game which was against the Brisbane Broncos in Round 1 2000 at Campbelltown Stadium. He retired after the 2000 season.

References

1972 births
Living people
Australian rugby league players
Wests Tigers players
Balmain Tigers players
Rugby league second-rows
Rugby league players from Temora, New South Wales